The 2015 Molecaten Drentse Acht van Westerveld was the 9th running of the Acht van Westerveld, a women's bicycle race in the Netherlands starting and finishing in Dwingeloo. It was rated by the UCI as a 1.2 category race.

Results

See also
 2015 in women's road cycling

References

External links
  

Ronde van Drenthe (women's race)
Drentse 8 van Dwingeloo
Drentse 8 van Dwingeloo